"Stranger Things" is a song by new wave group ABC, released as the third single from their album Skyscraping.

Track listing

UK CD single 
 "Stranger Things" - 4:07
 "The World Spins On" - 3:43
 "All We Need" - 4:32
 "Stranger Things" (Acoustic) - 5:06

Chart performance

References

ABC (band) songs
1997 songs
Songs written by Martin Fry
Songs written by Glenn Gregory
Songs written by Keith Lowndes
1997 singles